The Valiant Ones is a 1975 Taiwan and Hong Kong wuxia film written and directed by King Hu. The film portrays a Ming-era conflict between Chinese officials and Japanese pirates mediated by a husband-and-wife martial arts duo.

Synopsis

Facing threats from Japanese pirates along China's southern coast, Chinese Ming dynasty officials recruit a husband-and-wife martial arts duo to fight their adversaries.

Release

The Valiant Ones was screened at the 1975 Chicago International Film Festival, where it was nominated for Best Feature Film. The film also screened at the 1995 International Film Festival Rotterdam and the 2019 Hong Kong International Film Festival. The Harvard Film Archive organized a screening of the film as part of its 2013 film program King Hu and the Art of Wuxia in association with the Taiwan Ministry of Culture. The Valiant Ones is also periodically screened at the Berkeley Art Museum and Pacific Film Archive as part of its film exhibits.

Reception

Chris Berry, previously associate professor of film studies at UC Berkeley, lauded the film's "intricate web of betrayals and plots". He described that "the only nobility to be had is within the swords of the valiant ones, those doomed to protect the shores of an empire rotting from the inside". The Harvard Film Archive called The Valiant Ones King Hu's "last true wuxiafilm". They described that the film's "choreography—action is expressed in calligraphic strokes such as the brief clanging of blades, the whizzing-by of arrows and the rhythmic flight of bodies—the film is nevertheless majestic in its evocation of landscape. But unlike the preternaturally gifted heroes of most swordplay films, Hu’s valiant ones are mortal".

Derek Elley writes that "The Valiant Ones... is replete with the expected ebb and flow of artifice, suspicion and sylvan sussuration-- Hu [has the] masterly skill at evoking a sense of dislocated reality, the pregnant calm which signals imminent danger... Hu shows his perennial concern for the ruthlessly rigid pecking-order of power structures--expressed, as always, through skill in the martial arts".

References

External links
 
 

1975 films
1970s Mandarin-language films
Taiwanese action films
Hong Kong action films
Films directed by King Hu
1970s Hong Kong films